Dame Annette Egerton, DBE (formerly Penhaligon, née Lidgey; born 9 February 1946) is a British politician.

Annette Lidgey was born to Owen Bennett and Mabel (née Richards) Lidgey, and was educated at Truro Girls Grammar School, Truro. On 6 January 1968, she married the Liberal politician David Penhaligon. He had recently taken over his father's job as sub-postmaster at Chacewater, Cornwall, and after their marriage she took over that role until 1976. When her husband was elected Member of Parliament for Truro in 1974, Annette became his secretary and remained as such until his death in a car accident in 1986. From 1987-94, she was a member of Carrick District Council and in 1993 was appointed Dame Commander of the Order of the British Empire (DBE) for her public service and contributions to politics. 

From 1992-2002 she was a non-executive director of Cornwall Independent Radio, becoming also a founding director of Pirate FM, and served as a member of Restormel Borough Council from 2003 until it was abolished in 2009. In the borough council's final year she was Leader of the Council, replacing Tim Jones. In 1994, she married Robert Egerton.

Sources
Peerage & Gentry

External links

Dame Annette Penhaligon at Truro Constituency supper 11 March 2006 from Graham Watson's website
Penhaligon Friends

1946 births
Living people
People from Truro
Politicians from Cornwall
Dames Commander of the Order of the British Empire
Liberal Party (UK) politicians
Councillors in Cornwall
Place of birth missing (living people)
Women councillors in England